Falconbury School was a prep-school based in Peaks Hill, Surrey England, in the UK.

Falconbury's buildings in Surrey became home to The John Fisher School in 1931; a former Catholic Public and Boarding School, latterly (in the 1990s) a highly selective Catholic day school and now a non-selective Catholic comprehensive school for boys.

At Peaks Hill, Surrey

Peaks Hill at the time, was a rural neighbourhood in North Surrey; it has since merged with the expansion of Croydon, Surrey and these days is more suburban in nature.

Falconbury school prepared boys for entry to some of the major Public Schools in England; including Eton College and Sherborne School.

Move to Oxfordshire

In 1940 Falconbury School relocated to Astrop Park in Oxfordshire.

More information can be found at https://web.archive.org/web/20130921091532/http://www.bahamianseashells.com/falconbury2.html

Defunct schools in Surrey
Defunct schools in Oxfordshire